Walthamstow Studios was a British film studio located in Walthamstow, London which operated between 1914 and 1930. Two earlier studios had previously existed in Walthamstow. It was the base of Broadwest films for a number of years, which also used Catford Studios as an overflow facility. It was later owned by British Filmcraft. After the bankruptcy the studios were sold off for non-film use.

Selected films
 The Merchant of Venice (1916)
 The Case of Lady Camber (1920)
 Christie Johnstone (1921)
 The Burgomaster of Stilemonde (1929)

References

Bibliography
 Warren, Patricia. British Film Studios: An Illustrated History. Batsford, 2001.

British film studios
Media and communications in the London Borough of Waltham Forest
Buildings and structures in the London Borough of Waltham Forest
Film production companies of the United Kingdom
Walthamstow